Mark Jeremy Strange (born 2 November 1961) is a British Anglican bishop. He is the current Bishop of Moray, Ross and Caithness in the Scottish Episcopal Church. He is the Primus of the Scottish Episcopal Church, having been elected at an Episcopal Synod in Edinburgh on 27 June 2017.

Early life and education
He was educated at the University of Aberdeen; he was awarded a Licentiate of Theology in 1982. After working in one of the Licensed trades from 1982 to 1984, he continued his education at Lincoln Theological College, C.M.M. 1987.

Ordained ministry
He was ordained in the Anglican ministry a deacon in 1989 and priest in 1990. His first pastoral appointment was as a curate at St Barnabas with Christ Church, Worcester (1989–92), then the Vicar of St Wulstan's, Warndon, Worcester (1992–98). He moved to Scotland, where, from 1998 to 2007, he was the Rector of Holy Trinity, Elgin and Priest in charge of the churches of St Margaret's, Lossiemouth, St Michael's, Dufftown and St Margaret's, Aberlour.

Episcopal ministry
He was elected Bishop of Moray, Ross and Caithness in June 2007, and consecrated and installed in a special service at St Andrew's Cathedral, Inverness on 13 October 2007. On 27 June 2017, he was elected Primus of the Scottish Episcopal Church.

References

External links

 Biography of Bishop Mark Strange
 The Bishop of Moray, Ross & Caithness

1961 births
Living people
21st-century Scottish Episcopalian bishops
Alumni of the University of Aberdeen
Bishops of Moray, Ross and Caithness
Alumni of Lincoln Theological College
Primuses of the Scottish Episcopal Church